The WAGR D class was a class of 4-6-4T tank locomotive operated by the Western Australian Government Railways (WAGR) between 1912 and 1964.

History
In 1911 the WAGR placed an order with the North British Locomotive Company for twenty 4-6-4T locomotives to haul suburban passenger services in Perth. All entered service between June and September 1912. Commencing in 1932, all bar D386 were rebuilt as the Ds class with superheated boilers. In 1935, D377 was fitted with larger side tanks increasing its water capacity by 210 gallons, these were removed in May 1959. With the arrival of the ADH class diesel multiple units in 1953, withdrawals commenced with the last withdrawn in November 1965.

The D class was also the basis for the later Dm and Dd classes of tank engine, which continued this role until the end of steam.

Class list
The numbers and periods in service of each member of the D class were as follows:

Namesakes
The D class designation was previously used for the D class locomotive that was withdrawn in 1903. It was reused in the 1970s when the D class diesel locomotives entered service.

See also

Rail transport in Western Australia
List of Western Australian locomotive classes

References

Notes

Cited works

External links

NBL locomotives
Railway locomotives introduced in 1912
D WAGR class
3 ft 6 in gauge locomotives of Australia
4-6-4T locomotives
Scrapped locomotives
Passenger locomotives